In Christian theology, legalism (or nomism) is a pejorative term applied to the idea that "by doing good works or by obeying the law, a person earns and merits salvation." 

The Encyclopedia of Christianity in the United States defines legalism as a pejorative descriptor for "the direct or indirect attachment of behaviors, disciplines, and practices to the belief in order to achieve salvation and right standing before God", emphasizing a need "to perform certain deeds in order to gain salvation" (works). Additionally, legalism pejoratively refers to the view that Christians should not engage in social practices perceived as contrary to a Christian witness, such as gambling, dancing, consuming alcohol, enjoying secular entertainment, or wearing immodest clothing; abstinence from these things is found among fundamental Baptist, Conservative Anabaptist and Conservative Holiness denominations. 

What is viewed as "legalistic" may depend on the Christian denomination; in contrast to Lutheran theology that revolves around the doctrine of justification by faith, Christians of the Anabaptist tradition (who teach salvation by "faith that works") have argued that being a disciple of Jesus by careful obedience to New Testament commands (such as the holy kiss, baptism, communion, headcovering, and feet washing), is "crucial evidence that an individual has repented, believed, and yielded to Christ." The Anabaptist theologian Menno Simons rebuffed the Lutheran charge of legalism by referencing :

Reformed commentator Anna Grace Wood stated, "If in 1 Corinthians 11, God commands the wearing of fabric head coverings in worship and we reject this teaching, we are in sin because we are rejecting the Word of God." The Christian expositor Tony Cooke, citing , has stated that the term "legalist" has been often applied incorrectly to those following biblical directives "that pertain to holiness, obedience, and living godly lives", concluding that "God's grace leads us into obedience, not away from it." In the same vein, the theologian Leonard Ravenhill summated: "When there is something in the Bible that churches don't like, they call it 'legalism'."

The Pharisees and Sadducees, as described in the Gospels, are often regarded in general by Christians as legalists. Historically, many Christian New Testament scholars attacked Judaism for supposedly being "legalistic"; this accusation has been rebutted by other scholars, such as E. P. Sanders, who identify this criticism as inaccurate and ahistorical. 

Antinomianism is often regarded as the opposite of legalism, with situational ethics as a third possible position.

This is divine law as the legalist defined it."

See also

Free grace theology
Antinomian Controversy

References

External links

Legalism: Its Fruits and the True Grace of God - Emanuel Lapp (Ephrata Christian Fellowship): Anabaptist perspective 

Normative ethics
Christian ethics
Theories of law
Judaism in the New Testament
Christian terminology
Christian law
Christian theology
Pejorative terms